Xyris complanata, known as the feathered yellow-eye is a tufted herb in the Xyridaceae family. It is native to southern China, India, Sri Lanka, Thailand, Cambodia, Laos, Vietnam, Malaysia, Indonesia (Java, Sulawesi, Kalimantan, Sumatra), the Philippines, New Guinea and Australia (New South Wales, Queensland, Northern Territory and Western Australia). It is also  naturalized in Hawaii where it is known as Hawai'i yelloweyed grass. In New South Wales it grows in moist areas, often near swamps or in heathland.

The specific epithet complanata refers to the flattened leaf stalk.  This species first appeared in scientific literature in the year 1810.

References

complanata
Flora of Asia
Flora of Australia
Flora of New Guinea
Plants described in 1810